Yukarıserinyer is a village in the Kiğı District, Bingöl Province, Turkey. The village is populated by Kurds of the Kubat tribe and had a population of 27 in 2021.

The hamlet of Çakırlı is attached to the village.

References 

Villages in Kiğı District
Kurdish settlements in Bingöl Province